Chandler "Chad" Hall (born May 23, 1986) is an American football coach and former player. He played college football at Air Force, and was signed by the Philadelphia Eagles as an unrestricted free agent in 2010 after going undrafted in 2008. Hall also played for the San Francisco 49ers and Kansas City Chiefs. He is currently a wide receivers coach for the Jacksonville Jaguars.

College career

After graduating from Wesleyan School in Norcross, Georgia, Hall attended the United States Air Force Academy, where he lettered in football for three years. He was initially recruited to play quarterback, but after his freshman year he was converted to running back. During his senior year, he played wide receiver in addition to running back and return specialist.

Hall set an Air Force record with 275 yards rushing in a win against Army on November 3, 2007. He also rushed for one touchdown, caught three passes for 19 yards, and returned three punts for 39 yards.

On November 10 against Notre Dame, Hall rushed for 132 yards on 32 carries, caught two passes for 31 yards, and returned three kickoffs for 99 yards. He finished with 272 all-purpose yards in the win.

He was the only player in the country to lead his team in rushing and receiving during his senior year. He finished third in the nation in all-purpose yards. Late in his senior year (2007), he was campaigned to win the Heisman Trophy.

Air Force
From 2008–2009, Hall served in the United States Air Force as a second lieutenant. He was based in Hill Air Force Base in Utah as a maintenance officer, assigned to the 388th Maintenance Group.

Professional career

Philadelphia Eagles
After going undrafted in the 2008 NFL Draft, Hall tried out for the Atlanta Falcons during minicamp, but was not offered a contract. He also had a tryout for the Buffalo Bills.

Hall was signed by the Philadelphia Eagles to a three-year contract on March 11, 2010. Hall had worked out at the University of Utah's Pro Day on March 8. He was waived during final cuts on September 4, and re-signed to the team's practice squad on September 5. He was promoted to the active roster on October 9 following an injury to Riley Cooper. Hall rushed for 19 yards on four carries with one reception for five yards in week 7 against the Tennessee Titans.

Hall caught his first career touchdown pass on a four-yard reception from Kevin Kolb in the 2010 season finale against the Dallas Cowboys on January 2, 2011; he finished the game with six receptions for 84 yards.

During the 2011 offseason, Hall competed for the Eagles' sixth receiver spot and punt-returning duties with Sinorice Moss and Johnnie Lee Higgins. Despite leading the team in catches and receiving yards during the preseason, Hall was waived by the Eagles during final roster cuts on September 3, 2011, as the Eagles elected to only keep five receivers on the active roster. He was re-signed to the team's practice squad the following day. Hall was promoted to the active roster on November 16.

San Francisco 49ers
Hall was signed to the San Francisco 49ers practice squad on November 27, 2012, after injuries to 49ers running back Kendall Hunter and wide receiver Kyle Williams.
On January 19, 2013, he was promoted from the practice squad to the active roster and was active in the 2012-13 NFC championship game but did not record a statistic, he was inactive in Super Bowl XLVII. On August 31, 2013, Hall was cut from the San Francisco 49ers.

Kansas City Chiefs
On September 1, 2013, Hall was claimed by the Kansas City Chiefs, reuniting him with his former head coach Andy Reid. Hall was released on November 13, 2013 to make room for wide receiver Kyle Williams. However, shortly after signing, Williams was injured and Hall was subsequently re-signed on November 22, 2013.  Hall was released by the Chiefs on December 7, 2013. On December 13, 2013 Hall was re-signed by the Kansas City Chiefs. Chad Hall in 2013 caught two passes, one for nine yards and one for eleven yards for the Kansas City Chiefs. Hall was released by the Chiefs on December 19, 2013.

Jacksonville Jaguars
Hall was signed by the Jacksonville Jaguars on August 6, 2014, but was waived on August 16, 2014.

Coaching career
In 2017, Hall joined the Buffalo Bills coaching staff as an offensive assistant.

On February 2, 2019, Hall was promoted to Wide Receivers coach.

After his contract expired with the Bills at the end of the 2022 NFL season, Hall joined the Jacksonville Jaguars on February 10, 2023 as their Wide Receivers coach.

Personal life
Hall and his wife Rose married in May 2018. In September 2019, Chad and Rose welcomed their first child, a daughter named Penelope Rose. In February 2021, they welcomed their second child, a son named Chandler Wright. Hall's sister Kelly is married to Matthew Stafford.

References

External links

Buffalo Bills bio
Kansas City Chiefs bio
Philadelphia Eagles bio
Air Force Falcons football bio
College statistics at ESPN.com

1986 births
Living people
Players of American football from Georgia (U.S. state)
American football running backs
American football wide receivers
American football return specialists
Air Force Falcons football players
Philadelphia Eagles players
San Francisco 49ers players
Kansas City Chiefs players
Jacksonville Jaguars players
Buffalo Bills coaches